Turkmenistan has participated every edition at the Summer Youth Olympic Games since the inaugural 2010 Games and they participated the first time at the Winter Youth Olympic Games on 2020 Games.

Medal tables

Medals by Summer Games

Medals by Winter Games

Medals by summer sport

List of medalists

Summer Games

Summer Games medalists as part of Mixed-NOCs Team

Flag bearers

See also
Turkmenistan at the Olympics
Turkmenistan at the Paralympics

References

External links
Turkmenistan Olympic Committee

 
Youth sport in Turkmenistan
Nations at the Youth Olympic Games